Japanese missions to Joseon represent a crucial aspect of the international relations of mutual Joseon-Japan contacts and communication.  The bilateral exchanges were intermittent.

The unique nature of these bilateral diplomatic exchanges evolved from a conceptual framework developed by the Chinese.  Gradually, the theoretical model would be modified.  The changing model mirrors the evolution of a unique relationship between two neighboring states.

Muromachi shogunate missions to Joseon
The Muromachi bafuku's diplomatic contacts and communication with the Joseon court encompassed informal contacts and formal embassies.  Muromachi diplomacy also included the more frequent and less formal contacts involving the Japanese daimyo (feudal lord) of Tsushima Island.

In addition, trade missions between merchants of the area were frequent and varied.

 1403 –  A Japanese diplomatic mission from the Japanese shogun, Ashikaga Yoshimochi, was received in Seoul; and this set in motion the beginnings of a decision-making process about sending a responsive mission to Kyoto.
 1404 – Former-Shogun Ashikaga Yoshimitsu causes a message to the Joseon king to be sent; and the sender is identified as "king of Japan".  The salutation construes the Joseon monarch as the sender's co-equal peer.
 1422 – Nihonkoku Minamoto Yoshimochi sent the Joseon king a letter in Ōei 29, as time was reckoned using the Japanese calendar system.
 1423 – Nihonkoku Dosen sent the Joseon king a letter in Ōei 30.
 1424 – Nihonkoku Dosen sent the Joseon king a letter in Ōei 31.
 1428 – Nihonkoku Dosen sent the Joseon king a letter in Ōei 35.
 1432 – Shogun Ashikaga Yoshinori sent an ambassador to the Joseon court.
 1440 – Nihonkoku Minamoto Yoshinori sent the Joseon king a letter in Ryakuō 3, which the Japanese era at that time.
 1447  – Nihonkoku ō Minamoto Yoshinari sent the Joseon king a letter in Jōwa 3, which was the Japanese era at that time.
 1456 – Shogun Ashikaga Yoshimasa caused a letter to be sent to the king of Joseon.
 1474 – Shogun Ashikaga Yoshihisa sent an ambassador to China, stopping en route at the Joseon court in Seoul. The ambassador's charge was to seek an official seal from the Imperial Chinese court.
 1499 – Shogun Ashikaga Yoshizumi dispatched an envoy to the Joseon court asking for printing plates for an important Buddhist text; and although the specific request was not fulfilled, the Joseon court did agree to offer printed copies.

Tokugawa shogunate missions to Joseon 
In the Edo period of Japanese history, diplomatic missions were construed as benefiting the Japanese as legitimizing propaganda and as a key element in an emerging manifestation of Japan's ideal vision of the structure of an international order with Edo as its center.

Japanese-Joseon diplomacy adapting
Japanese-Joseon bilateral relations were affected by the increasing numbers of international contacts which required adaptation and a new kind of diplomacy.

1876
The Korea-Japan Treaty of 1876 marked the beginning of a new phase in bilateral relations.

See also
 Joseon missions to Japan
 Joseon missions to Imperial China
 Japanese missions to Imperial China
 Korean Empire
 Japanese missions to Paekche
 Japanese missions to Silla

Notes

References

 Ferris, William Wayne. (2009). Japan to 1600: a Social and Economic History. Honolulu: University of Hawaii Press. 
 Hall, John Whitney. (1997). The Cambridge History of Japan: Early Modern Japan. Cambridge: Cambridge University Press. ; 
  한일관계사연구논집편찬위원회. (2005). 통신사・왜관과한일관계 (Han Il kwangyesa yŏngu nonjip, Vol. 6). 경인문화사. .
 Kang, Etsuko Hae-jin. (1997). Diplomacy and Ideology in Japanese-Korean Relations: from the Fifteenth to the Eighteenth Century. Basingstoke, Hampshire; Macmillan. ; 
 Kang, Woong Joe. (2005). The Korean Struggle for International Identity in the Foreground of the Shufeldt Negotiation, 1866-1882. Latham, Maryland: University Press of America. ;  OCLC 238760185
 Titsingh, Isaac, ed. (1834). [Siyun-sai Rin-siyo/Hayashi Gahō, 1652], Nipon o daï itsi ran; ou,  Annales des empereurs du Japon.  Paris: Oriental Translation Fund of Great Britain and Ireland.  OCLC  84067437
 Toby, Ronald P. (1991).  State and Diplomacy in Early Modern Japan: Asia in the Development of the Tokugawa Bakufu. Stanford: Stanford University Press. ; 
 Walker, Brett L.  "Foreign Affairs and Frontiers in Early Modern Japan: A Historiographical Essay," Early Modern Japan. Fall, 2002, pp. 44–62, 124-128.

External links
 UNESCO:  Map of South and North Korea in Eight Province

Foreign relations of the Joseon dynasty
History of the foreign relations of Japan